Blake Nose is a submerged peninsula extending northeast from the North American continental shelf, located about 280 miles (460 km) east of Daytona Beach, Florida.  Part of the Blake Plateau, Blake Nose is about 40 mi (64 km) wide at the base of the peninsula and about 50 mi (80 km) long.

Blake Nose appears as a distinctive "spur" in online satellite maps which show the Atlantic continental shelf of Florida.

Plateaus of the Atlantic Ocean